Serra de Montsant is a mountain chain in Catalonia, Spain. The main populated area in the range is La Morera de Montsant.

Description
It is part of the Catalan Pre-Coastal Range. The main peaks are Roca Corbatera (1,163 m), Piló dels Senyalets (1,109 m) and la Cogulla (1,063 m).
The Serra de Montsant, meaning 'Holy Mountain Range' is thus named because there were many hermits living in the range in early Medieval times.

The Montsant mountain range is currently a protected area, the Serra de Montsant Natural Park.

Local wine
This mountain region is a famous red wine-producing zone; some of the best vineyards are located near the Cartoixa d'Escaladei, a Carthusian Order monastery. It gives its name to the Montsant wine-producing area.

Panorama

See also
Montsant DO
Catalan Pre-Coastal Range
Parc Natural de la Serra de Montsant
Mountains of Catalonia

References

External links

Institut Cartogràfic de Catalunya

Montsant
Priorat